WKEB (99.3 FM) is a radio station, licensed to Medford, Wisconsin, United States, that broadcasts an adult hits music format from a tower just north of the city. The station is currently owned by WIGM, Incorporated, and features programming from ABC Radio.

History
The station was assigned call sign WIGM-FM on December 31, 1968. On July 11, 1997, the station changed its call sign to the current WKEB.

References

External links

KEB
Adult hits radio stations in the United States